Suteria is a genus of air-breathing land snails, terrestrial gastropod molluscs in the family Charopidae. This genus is endemic to New Zealand.

Species
Species within the genus Suteria:
 Suteria ide (Gray, 1850)
 Suteria raricostata Cumber, 1962

References 

Charopidae
Gastropods of New Zealand